Le Conte Mountain is a  summit located on the shared boundary of Skagit County and Chelan County in Washington state. It is positioned on the crest of the North Cascades Range, and is set within the Glacier Peak Wilderness. Le Conte Mountain is situated on the shared border of Mount Baker-Snoqualmie National Forest and Okanogan-Wenatchee National Forest. Access to the peak is via the Ptarmigan Traverse. The Le Conte Glacier and South Cascade Glacier lie to the south of the peak. Precipitation runoff on the east side the mountain drains into Flat Creek which is a tributary of the Stehekin River, while precipitation drains into headwaters of the South Fork Cascade River from the west side.

History
This geographical feature's name was officially adopted by the U.S. Board on Geographic Names to honor geologist Joseph LeConte (1823–1901). The first ascent of the summit was made by Calder T. Bressler, Ralph W. Clough, Bill Cox and Tom Myers on July 23, 1938. The Southeast Ridge was first climbed in 1953 by Dale Cole, Robert Grant, Michael Hane, Erick Karlsson and Tom Miller, while the Northwest Ridge was first climbed in 1957 by Art Maki and Joe Quigley.

Climate
Le Conte Mountain is located in the marine west coast climate zone of western North America. Most weather fronts originate in the Pacific Ocean, and travel northeast toward the Cascade Mountains. As fronts approach the North Cascades, they are forced upward by the peaks of the Cascade Range, causing them to drop their moisture in the form of rain or snowfall onto the Cascades (Orographic lift). As a result, the west side of the North Cascades experiences high precipitation, especially during the winter months in the form of snowfall. Because of maritime influence, snow tends to be wet and heavy, resulting in avalanche danger. During winter months, weather is usually cloudy, but due to high pressure systems over the Pacific Ocean that intensify during summer months, there is often little or no cloud cover during the summer.

Geology
The North Cascades features some of the most rugged topography in the Cascade Range with craggy peaks and ridges, deep glacial valleys, and granite spires. Geological events occurring many years ago created the diverse topography and drastic elevation changes over the Cascade Range leading to the various climate differences. These climate differences lead to vegetation variety defining the ecoregions in this area.

The history of the formation of the Cascade Mountains dates back millions of years ago to the late Eocene Epoch. With the North American Plate overriding the Pacific Plate, episodes of volcanic igneous activity persisted. In addition, small fragments of the oceanic and continental lithosphere called terranes created the North Cascades about 50 million years ago.

During the Pleistocene period dating back over two million years ago, glaciation advancing and retreating repeatedly scoured the landscape leaving deposits of rock debris. The “U”-shaped cross section of the river valleys are a result of recent glaciation. Uplift and faulting in combination with glaciation have been the dominant processes which have created the tall peaks and deep valleys of the North Cascades area.

See also

 Geography of the North Cascades

References

External links
 Weather: Le Conte Mountain
 Le Conte Mountain photo: PBase

North Cascades
Mountains of Washington (state)
Mountains of Chelan County, Washington
Mountains of Skagit County, Washington
Cascade Range
North American 2000 m summits
Mount Baker-Snoqualmie National Forest